Pseudopostega paromias is a moth of the family Opostegidae. It was described by Edward Meyrick in 1915. It is known from Matucana, Peru.

The length of the forewings is about 4 mm. Adults have been recorded in July.

References

Opostegidae
Moths described in 1915